The Wilhelmina Mohle House is a house in southeast Portland, Oregon, United States, listed on the National Register of Historic Places.

See also
 National Register of Historic Places listings in Southeast Portland, Oregon

Further reading

References

1890 establishments in Oregon
Houses completed in 1890
Houses on the National Register of Historic Places in Portland, Oregon
Portland Eastside MPS
Queen Anne architecture in Oregon
Sunnyside, Portland, Oregon
Portland Historic Landmarks